Charles Gordon Zubrod (January 22, 1914 – January 19, 1999) was an American oncologist who played a prominent role in the introduction of chemotherapy for cancer. He was one of the recipients of the 1972 Albert Lasker Awards in recognition of his contributions to the field, amongst many other doctorates and awards.

Life and work
Zubrod, an alumnus of the Georgetown Preparatory School (class of 1932), the College of the Holy Cross (class of 1936), and Columbia University College of Physicians and Surgeons (1940 class), served in the U.S. army medical corps during World War II, where he worked on a replacement for quinine in the treatment of malaria. The unit eventually discovered chloroquine.

In 1946 he commenced work at Johns Hopkins University Medical School, and was appointed assistant professor of medicine and director of research at Saint Louis University in 1953. This position lasted briefly: he became clinical director of the National Institutes of Health in 1954 and became head of the Division of Cancer Treatment of the National Cancer Institute in 1956 and scientific director in 1961. Here, he put an emphasis on the development of new chemotherapy agents and their use in clinical trials. He is credited with the introduction of the platinum-containing compounds (e.g. cisplatin). Several other new classes of chemotherapeutics were identified under Zubrod's leadership.

Zubrod's name is also connected to a widely used assessment scale for performance of cancer patients, the Performance Status of the Eastern Cooperative Oncology Group (ECOG) for Patients with Cancer (Zubrod scale).

Zubrod left the NCI in 1974, and became a professor and chair of the department of oncology at the University of Miami School of Medicine (now the Leonard M. Miller School of Medicine) and served at the director of the Florida Comprehensive Cancer Center. He retired from this position in 1990.

See also
 History of cancer chemotherapy
 Performance status

Biography
 Frei III E. In Memoriam C. Gordon Zubrod MD.  J Clin Oncol 1999;17:1331-3. 
 A tribute to Dr. Charles Gordon Zubrod: January 22, 1914 - January 19, 1999. Miami, Fla.: University of Miami, 1999.

Books
 Sugarbaker, Everett V; Ketcham, Alfred S; Zubrod, C Gordon. Interdisciplinary cancer therapy : adjuvant therapy. Chicago: Year Book Medical Publishers, 1977. 
 Zubrod, C Gordon. Perspectives in cancer. In: Clinical Cancer Seminar (1975: Miami, Fla.). Hormones and Cancer. New York: Stratton Intercontinental Medical Book Corp., 1976.

Review papers
 Zubrod, CG.Historic milestones in curative chemotherapy. Semin Oncol. 1979 Dec;6(4):490-505. 
 Zubrod CG, Selawry O. The treatment of lung cancer. Adv Intern Med. 1978;23:451-67. 
 Zubrod CG. Present status of cancer chemotherapy. Life Sci. 1974 Mar 1;14(5):809-18. 
 Zubrod CG. Trends in chemotherapy research. Proc Can Cancer Conf. 1969;8:31-9. 
 Zubrod CG. The skin and antitumor drugs. Arch Dermatol. 1967 Nov;96(5):560-4.

External links
 Columbia University obituary
 College of the Holy Cross obituary

American oncologists
1914 births
1999 deaths
Columbia University Vagelos College of Physicians and Surgeons alumni
Recipients of the Lasker-DeBakey Clinical Medical Research Award
Georgetown Preparatory School alumni
20th-century American physicians